The President pro tempore of the Pennsylvania Senate (also known more commonly as the "President pro-tem") is a constitutionally-created office in the Commonwealth of Pennsylvania. The incumbent holder of the office is Republican Kim Ward.

Overview
The position of President pro tempore replaced the abolished position of Speaker of the Senate in the Constitution of 1874.

The office is filled through election by the full Senate membership, though its holder typically comes from the majority party. The President pro tempore is designated as second in the gubernatorial succession, behind the Lieutenant Governor.

Duties
The President pro tempore presides over the Senate in the absence of the Lieutenant Governor and appoints committee chairpersons, votes on all bills, and is the leader of the Senate. In issues involving both chambers of the General Assembly, the President pro tempore confers with the Speaker of the House.

List of presidents pro tempore of the Pennsylvania Senate

See also
Lieutenant Governor of Pennsylvania
President of the Pennsylvania Senate

References

External links
Pennsylvania Senate website

Government of Pennsylvania
Pennsylvania General Assembly